Jesse Walter Stanley (1869 – 1933) was an English footballer who played in the Football League for Northwich Victoria and Stoke.

Career
Stanley was born in Stoke-upon-Trent and began his career with Northwich Victoria. In 1891 he joined Stoke where he played in three matches before returning to Northwich.

Career statistics
Source:

References

English footballers
Northwich Victoria F.C. players
Stoke City F.C. players
English Football League players
1870 births
1933 deaths
Association football fullbacks